is an Australian-born Japanese actress, known for her role as Ran Mori in Shinichi Kudo's Written Challenge!, Minami Maho in Beck, Haru/Harumi in 125 Years Memory, and Yukio in Deadpool 2. She plays Mitsuki in the Apple TV+ series Invasion (2021). In 2014, she won the Japan Academy Film Prize for Newcomer of the Year.

Early life
Kutsuna was born on 22 December 1992 in Killarney Heights, Sydney. She lived in Australia until the age of 14 before moving to Japan to pursue a career as a model and actress.

Career
In 2006, Kutsuna won the Judge's Prize at the 2006 Japan Bishōjo Contest.

In 2009, she had her first major starring role. She played the part of Tsugumi Nitobe in 7 Mannin Tantei Nitobe (70 000 People Detective Nitobe), an ordinary college student who has 70,000 friends on the Internet and solves difficult cases by using their brains.

In 2011, she was cast to play Ran Mori in a special drama for the live-action of Detective Conan, a popular manga series written by Gosho Aoyama. She replaced Tomoka Kurokawa, who played Ran in the previous specials in 2006 and 2007.

In 2012, she was named Best New Actress of 2011 by film magazine Kinema Junpo.

In 2015, she appeared in two leading roles as Haru/Harumi in the Japanese-Turkish co-production 125 Years Memory.

She played mutant Yukio in the 2018 film Deadpool 2.

In 2022, it was revealed that she will appear in Hideo Kojima's Death Stranding 2.

Personal life
In 2011, together with actresses Mayuko Kawakita and Riko Narumi, Kutsuna graduated from Horikoshi High School.

In 2013, she dropped out of college before starting her third year, for the sake of her career. Her agency said: "It really was difficult for her to work while going to school. She had a hard time attending classes due to her work in dramas. She accepted this and dropped out. She will now be focusing on her acting career".

Kutsuna is fluent in both English and Japanese. She used to work under Oscar Promotion.

Filmography

Film

Television

Video games

Commercials

2008
 NTT東日本 DENPO115
 Pocky 2008–2010 (第50 – 51代 Pocky Princess)
 Aera Home クラージュ
 TAKARATOMY Hi-kara

2010
 MOS Burger
 KYOTO KIMONO YUZEN

2011
 SUNTORY Oolong Tea Premium Clear
 dip はたらくスマイルプロジェクト (星野夏子 役)

2012
 Aera Home「環境設計の家」
 DAIHATSU Campaign (ダイハツ キャンペーン)
 カリエ Noz BEASHOW
 EPSON (セイコーエプソン カラリオ)

2013
 Pokka「ヒラメキ宣言」
 Pokka キレートレモン
 LION デンタークリアMAXライオン

2014
 ゲオホールディングス 2nd STREET / JUMBLE STORE
 MOSDO!
 Pokka 企業
 Hay Day (Supercell ヘイ・デイ)

Promotional videos
 11 December 2008 ORANGE RANGE Oshare Banchou feat. Soy Sauce 「おしゃれ番長 feat.ソイソース / 中華料理 篇」
 17 June 2009 ASIA ENGINEER「僕にできる事のすべて」

Accolades

References

External links
  
 
 

1992 births
Living people
21st-century Australian actresses
Horikoshi High School alumni
Actresses from Sydney
Actresses from Tokyo
Australian female models
Models from Sydney
Australian people of Japanese descent
Australian emigrants to Japan
Japanese idols
Australian film actresses
Australian television actresses
21st-century Japanese actresses
Australian actresses of Asian descent